Elverum Fotball is the association football section of the sports club Elverum IL from Elverum, Norway. They compete in the 3. divisjon, the fourth tier in the Norwegian football league system.

History
It was founded on 30 June 1907 under the name Elverum Footballklub.

Elverum played in the 2. divisjon for many years. In 1995, it won its group and was promoted to the 1996 1. divisjon, but was relegated after one year. Between 2000 and 2004, Elverum was relegated and promoted every other year; they played in the 3. divisjon from 2005 to 2010. Elverum won their 3. divisjon group in 2005 and 2006, but lost the playoff-promotion until they won the promotion-playoff in 2010 and returned to the 2. divisjon.

The club was promoted to the First Division again after the 2012 season, but was relegated after only one season back at the second tier.

In the 2016 season, Elverum once again gained promotion back to 1. divisjon.

In 2017, Elverum reached the Fourth round of the Cup for the first time in the club's history.

At the end of the 2017 season, they were once again relegated to the 2. divisjon.

Recent history 
{|class="wikitable"
|-bgcolor="#efefef"
! Season
! 
! Pos.
! Pl.
! W
! D
! L
! GS
! GA
! P
!Cup
!Notes
|-
|2008
|3. divisjon
|align=right |3
|align=right|22||align=right|13||align=right|5||align=right|4
|align=right|83||align=right|34||align=right|44
||First qualifying round
|
|-
|2009
|3. divisjon
|align=right |6
|align=right|22||align=right|10||align=right|3||align=right|9
|align=right|62||align=right|56||align=right|33
||First round
|
|-
|2010
|3. divisjon
|align=right bgcolor=#DDFFDD| 1
|align=right|22||align=right|17||align=right|1||align=right|4
|align=right|61||align=right|20||align=right|52
||Second qualifying round
|Promoted to the 2. divisjon
|-
|2011
|2. divisjon
|align=right |4
|align=right|24||align=right|12||align=right|6||align=right|6
|align=right|38||align=right|26||align=right|42
||First round
|
|-
|2012 
|2. divisjon
|align=right bgcolor=#DDFFDD| 1
|align=right|26||align=right|14||align=right|9||align=right|3
|align=right|57||align=right|30||align=right|51
||First round
|Promoted to the 1. divisjon
|-
|2013 
|1. divisjon
|align=right bgcolor="#FFCCCC"| 16
|align=right|30||align=right|3||align=right|6||align=right|21
|align=right|37||align=right|67||align=right|15
||Third round
|Relegated to the 2. divisjon
|-
|2014
|2. divisjon
|align=right |3
|align=right|26||align=right|15||align=right|7||align=right|4
|align=right|55||align=right|27||align=right|52
||Second round
|
|-
|2015
|2. divisjon
|align=right |2
|align=right|26||align=right|12||align=right|6||align=right|8
|align=right|47||align=right|35||align=right|42
||Second round
|
|-
|2016
|2. divisjon
|align=right bgcolor=#DDFFDD| 1
|align=right|26||align=right|20||align=right|4||align=right|2
|align=right|68||align=right|13||align=right|63
||Second round
|Promoted to the 1. divisjon
|-
|2017
|1. divisjon
|align=right bgcolor="#FFCCCC"| 15
|align=right|30||align=right|4||align=right|12||align=right|14
|align=right|29||align=right|51||align=right|24
|Fourth round
|Relegated to the 2. divisjon
|-
|2018
|2. divisjon
|align=right |6
|align=right|26||align=right|12||align=right|8||align=right|6
|align=right|53||align=right|39||align=right|44
|Second round
|
|-
|2019 
|2. divisjon
|align=right bgcolor="#FFCCCC"| 12
|align=right|26||align=right|7||align=right|5||align=right|14
|align=right|34||align=right|46||align=right|26
|Second round
|Relegated to the 3. divisjon
|-
|2020
|colspan="11"|Season cancelled
|-
|2021
|3. divisjon
|align=right |3
|align=right|13||align=right|7||align=right|4||align=right|2
|align=right|27||align=right|18||align=right|25
|First round
|
|-
|2022
|3. divisjon
|align=right |3
|align=right|26||align=right|16||align=right|7||align=right|3
|align=right|64||align=right|34||align=right|55
|Second round
|
|}
Source:

Stadium 
Elverum Fotball play their home games at Elverum Stadion, also known as Sentralidrettsplassen, which was inaugurated in 1950. In 2007, the stadium was upgraded with floodlight and artificial grass before once again being updated ahead of the 2013 season when they returned to the First Division. The highest home attendance was 4,633, in 1991, when local rivals Ham-Kam visited Elverum in a league game.

Statistics 
Greatest victory: 12–0 against Nordre Trysil in 1954 and against Lom in 2001.
Highest home attendance: 4,633 in a league game against Ham-Kam in 1991.
Best league position: 5th in the First Division, 1992.
Best cup result: 4th round in 2017.

Famous players 
Vegar Eggen Hedenstad, now Rosenborg
Eirik Dybendahl, now IFK Norrköping
Stig Inge Bjørnebye, former Liverpool F.C. and Blackburn Rovers
Ole Petter Skonnord, former Dundee FC
Terje Olsen, former Bayer Leverkusen
Svein Skårås, former Kvik Halden

References

External links 
Official site

Football clubs in Norway
Association football clubs established in 1907
Elverum
Sport in Hedmark
1907 establishments in Norway